Fahrlander See is a lake at Potsdam, Brandenburg, Germany. At an elevation of 29.4 m, its surface area is 2.105 km². The Sacrow–Paretz Canal flows through the lake.

See also 
Jungfernsee

Lakes of Brandenburg
Geography of Potsdam
LFahrlanderSee